Laura Pomportes (born 16 April 1986 in Toulouse) is a professional squash player who represents France. She reached a career-high world ranking of World No. 51 in July 2015.

Career
In 2016, she was part of the French team that won the bronze medal at the 2016 Women's World Team Squash Championships in her home country.

References

External links 
 
 
 

French female squash players
Living people
1989 births